The Świnoujście LNG terminal (also referred as Terminal LNG in Świnoujście, Polskie LNG Baltic LNG, or gazoport) is a liquefied natural gas (LNG) import terminal at Świnoujście, in the extreme north-west of Poland near the Polish-German border. The LNG terminal is operated by Polskie LNG S.A., a subsidiary of Gaz-System. The cornerstone for construction was laid on 23 March 2011 and it took its first LNG delivery on 11 December 2015. Together with the 10 bcm of natural gas that Poland will (starting in 2023) receive annually from Norway via the Baltic Pipe natural gas pipeline, the Świnoujście LNG terminal will allow Poland achieve its long-term goal of becoming fully independent of Russian natural gas, which had previously been the source of almost all of the country's natural gas.

History

Discussions about the project started in 2006. The project was originally developed by PGNiG through its subsidiary Polskie LNG S.A. In January 2008, SNC-Lavalin was chosen for the front-end engineering design.  The engineering, procurement and construction contract was signed with a consortium of Saipem, Techint, Snamprogetti, and PBG.  
Construction started in March 2011.  The first LNG delivery to the terminal is expected on 11 December 2015. 
After creation of Gaz-System and its separation from PGNiG, the newly created company took over the ownership of Polskie LNG S.A. The terminal was inaugurated by prime minister Ewa Kopacz on 12 October 2015. 
The gas carrier has delivered the first order on 11 December 2015.

The total cost of the terminal is €950 million (PLN 3.638 billion), including PLN 888 million in grants, subsidies, and loans from the European Union.

Technical description

The terminal has unloading jetty for large LNG tankers, two storage tanks and regasification train.

Expansion

In June 2020, Polskie LNG and the Szczecin and Świnoujście Seaports Authority signed agreements with the consortium of PORR SA and TGE Gas Engineering GmbH for the expansion of the LNG terminal. The agreements concern the expansion of the land and sea parts of the terminal. The construction of the third tank is expected to be completed by 2023 and will cost approximately PLN 1.9 billion.

There is a plan to create a gas corridor from the Świnoujście terminal to Adria LNG terminal in Croatia.

See also

References

External links

 Polskie LNG S.A.

Buildings and structures in West Pomeranian Voivodeship
Energy in Poland
Energy infrastructure in Poland
Liquefied natural gas terminals
Natural gas in Poland
LNG